Tatai Atlétikai Club  is a Hungarian handball club from Tata, that plays in the  Nemzeti Bajnokság I/B, the second level championship in Hungary.

Crest, colours, supporters

Naming history

Kit manufacturers and Shirt sponsor
The following table shows in detail Tatai AC kit manufacturers and shirt sponsors by year:

Kits

Sports Hall information
Name: – Güntner Aréna Városi Sportcsarnok
City: – Tata
Capacity: – 500
Address: – 2890 Tata, Kőkút köz 2.

Management

Current squad
Squad for the 2020–21 season

Transfers
Transfers for the 2020–21 season

Joining 
  Dávid Pulai (GK) (from  ETO-SZESE Győr FKC)  Miklós Schneider (CB) (from  ETO-SZESE Győr FKC)
  Norbert Blázsovics (GK) (from  KK Ajka)  Dániel Gajdos (LP) (from  Sport36-Komló)
  Ádám Iváncsik (LW) (from  Szigetszentmiklósi KSK)Leaving 
  Dávid Koczka (GK) 
  Xavér Deményi (GK) (to  Ferencvárosi TC)  Márton Mizser (LW) 
  István Mátó (LP) (to  KK Ajka)Previous Squads

Honours

Recent seasons
Seasons in Nemzeti Bajnokság I: 17
Seasons in Nemzeti Bajnokság I/B'': 13

References

External links
  
 

Handball clubs established in 1984
Hungarian handball clubs
Komárom-Esztergom County